Anguloa uniflora, commonly known as the swaddled babies orchid, is a species of orchid and is the type species of its genus.

References

uniflora